Mark Francis Dennis (born April 15, 1965) is a former American football offensive tackle who played ten seasons in the National Football League for the Miami Dolphins, the Cincinnati Bengals, and the Carolina Panthers.

1965 births
Living people
People from Junction City, Kansas
Players of American football from Kansas
American football offensive tackles
Illinois Fighting Illini football players
Miami Dolphins players
Cincinnati Bengals players
Carolina Panthers players